Dumnagual was the name of several kings of Alt Clut, later known as Strathclyde:

Dumnagual I of Alt Clut (c. 6th century)
Dumnagual II of Alt Clut (7th century)
Dumnagual III of Alt Clut (mid-8th century)
Dumnagual IV of Alt Clut (9th century)

See also
Dyfnwal (disambiguation)